Star One C3 is a communications satellite operated by Star One, a subsidiary of Embratel. It was built by Orbital Sciences Corporation based on the STAR-2 satellite bus, and was launched on 10 November 2012 21:05 UTC by an Ariane 5ECA carrier rocket, as part of a dual-payload launch with Eutelsat 21B.

Star One C3 will replace Brasilsat B3 in the 75° W position. The start mass was 3226.6 kg.

See also

 Star One (satellite operator)
 Star One C1
 Star One C2

References

External links
 Arianespace launch press kit
 Star One C3 coverage maps as files.
 Star One C3 coverage maps on Google Maps.
 Star One C3 realtime tracking.

Communications satellites in geosynchronous orbit
Spacecraft launched in 2012
Satellites using the GEOStar bus
Star One satellites